The town of Tarapur is located in the Indian state of Odisha, on the eastern coast of India. Three stupas (edicts), put up by Emperor Asoka, have been discovered at Tarapur recently.

External links
article on the discovery of the stupas

Stupas in India
Tourism in Odisha
Cities and towns in Puri district